Lewis Orin Barrows (June 7, 1893 – January 30, 1967) was an American politician and the 57th Governor of Maine.

Early life 
Barrows was born in Newport, Maine on June 7, 1893.  He studied in the local schools of Newport, and later attended the University of Maine, from which he graduated in 1916 with a Bachelor of Science degree in pharmacy.

At the start of his career, Barrows was employed in his family's drug store, and he later became involved in the insurance business.

Politics 
Barrow became the treasurer of Newport and held that position for twelve years. In 1926, he became a Republican state committeeman. He became a member of the governor's executive council in 1927. He held that position until 1933. He served as Maine's secretary of state from 1935 to 1936.

Barrow was nominated by the Republican Party for the governorship of Maine in 1936, and went on to win the general election. In 1937, Barrows sent the Maine Army National Guard to Lewiston, Maine and Auburn, Maine following a melee between workers and the local police during the Lewiston-Auburn Shoe Strike. He was also successful in his re-election bid in 1938, and held the governor's office from January 6, 1937, to January 1, 1941. During his administration, the state deficit of Maine was reduced, the budget was balanced, the state school fund was improved, old-age benefits payments were reinstated, the Maine Development Commissions' duties were increased, and federal funding was secured and those funding were used for the construction of new bridges, highways and public buildings.

Later years 
After leaving the governor's office, Barrows worked for the Liberty Mutual Insurance Company in Boston. He died on January 30, 1967, in Pittsfield, Maine.

References

Sources

Internet

Books

External sources
 Sobel, Robert and John Raimo. Biographical Directory of the Governors of the United States, 1789-1978. Greenwood Press, 1988. 

1893 births
1967 deaths
Republican Party governors of Maine
People from Newport, Maine
University of Maine alumni
20th-century American politicians